Urodeta absidata is a moth of the family Elachistidae. It is found in Cameroon.

The wingspan is 6-6.8 mm. The thorax, tegula and forewing are grey brown, mottled with blackish brown tipped scales. The hindwings are brownish grey. Adults have been recorded in early May and early December.

Etymology
The species name is derived from the Latin absidatus (meaning arched) and refers to the arched inner processes of valvae.

References

Endemic fauna of Cameroon
Elachistidae
Moths described in 2011
Insects of Cameroon
Moths of Africa